Herbert Morse (10 June 19182 February 2008), known professionally as Barry Morse, was a British-Canadian actor of stage, screen, and radio, best known for his roles in the ABC television series The Fugitive and the British sci-fi drama Space: 1999. His performing career spanned seven decades and he had thousands of roles to his credit, including work for the BBC and the Canadian Broadcasting Corporation.

Beginnings
Herbert Morse (he changed his name to Barry) was born on 10 June 1918, in the Hammersmith area of west London (Morse later claimed to have been born in Shoreditch in London's East End but publicly-accessible birth records confirm Hammersmith), a son of Charles Hayward Morse and Mary Florence Hollis Morse. His parents owned a tobacco shop. Morse was a 15-year-old errand boy when he won a scholarship to the Royal Academy of Dramatic Art. He performed the role of the Lion in Androcles and the Lion, and as a result, came to know George Bernard Shaw, a patron of the academy. His first paid job as an actor while still a student was in If I Were King. At graduation, he starred in the title role of William Shakespeare's Henry V, presented as a Royal Command Performance for King George VI and Queen Elizabeth.

Career

Radio
Upon graduation, Morse won the BBC's Radio Prize which led to several parts and a leading role in The Fall of the City. Later, among dozens of other roles, he played the lead in Shakespeare's Hamlet and starred as Paul Temple in the radio series Send for Paul Temple Again. He later performed on Canadian Broadcasting Corporation radio beginning in 1951 and continuing to the 1980s, including the long-running series A Touch of Greasepaint, the Joe McCarthy-inspired The Investigator, and 1984. He also starred in a number of U.S. productions in the 1970s and 1980s for producer Yuri Rasovsky, including The Odyssey of Homer, which won a Peabody Award.

Morse's final radio performance, Rogues and Vagabonds – A Theatrical Scrapbook, aired on internet radio KSAV on 7 August and 9 August 2007, prior to being released on compact disc. The hour-long special audio drama comprised a half-dozen vignettes and performances culled from theatrical history, including Shakespeare and Shaw.

British stage
Morse was a member of repertory theatre companies in Peterborough, Nottingham, and other cities, where he gained experience as an actor while playing more than 200 roles. In 1941, he joined the national tour of The First Mrs. Fraser starring Dame Marie Tempest and A.E. Matthews. He debuted on the London West End stage in The School for Slavery. Other West End productions included Escort, The Assassin, and A Bullet in the Ballet. He was directed by John Gielgud in Crisis in Heaven. Morse developed a theatrical partnership with actress Nova Pilbeam, and they worked together both in film and on stage, most notably in the hit stage productions of The Voice of the Turtle and Flowers for the Living.

Film
Morse made his film debut in the 1942 comedy The Goose Steps Out starring Will Hay and continued with roles in Thunder Rock, When We Are Married, and This Man Is Mine (released as A Soldier for Christmas in North America) with Glynis Johns and Nova Pilbeam. Other notable films include Kings of the Sun with Yul Brynner, Justine, and Puzzle of a Downfall Child with Faye Dunaway. He also appeared in the thrillers Asylum (1972) with Peter Cushing, Funeral Home with Kay Hawtrey and Lesleh Donaldson (1980), and The Changeling with George C. Scott (1980). He worked on several Lacewood animated productions, notably as the voice of Dragon in The Railway Dragon, alongside Tracey Moore, who played Emily. In 1999, he filmed the dramatic comedy Taxman with Billy Zane, released as Promise Her Anything and on DVD as Nothing to Declare. His final film appearance was in I Really Hate My Job, released in 2007.

Later stage work
Morse performed on Broadway in Hide and Seek, Salad Days, and the lead of Frederick Rolfe in Hadrian the Seventh, which he also played in Australia, co-starring with Frank Thring. He directed the Broadway debut of Staircase starring Eli Wallach and Milo O'Shea, seen at the time as a groundbreaking depiction of gay male life. He also starred in the U.S. national tour of Harold Pinter's The Caretaker as Davies.

He first presented a version of his one-man show Merely Players in 1959, which explored the experiences of actors through history, with the definitive version of the show debuting in 1984 for a Canadian national tour. 
Morse served as artistic director of the Shaw Festival of Canada for the 1966 season and as an adjunct professor at Yale Drama School in 1968.

In 1995, he premiered the Elizabeth Sharland play The Private Life of George Bernard Shaw in Toronto, also starring Shirley Knight. The play featured Morse in the role of Shaw, with 10 actresses portraying the various women in Shaw's life. Morse later performed the play in 1997 at the British Theatre Museum in London.

With his son Hayward Morse, he starred in the 2004 North American debut of Bernard and Bosie: A Most Unlikely Friendship by Anthony Wynn, performed at the University of Florida, Sarasota. This two-act stage drama is based on the correspondence between playwright George Bernard Shaw, played by Morse, and Lord Alfred 'Bosie' Douglas (Oscar Wilde's boyfriend), played by Hayward.

The following year, Morse appeared in the world premiere performance of the science-fiction play Contact by Doug Grissom, co-starring Ryan Case and presented in Tampa, Florida.

Television

Guest roles
Morse guest-starred in more than a thousand drama, comedy, and talk-show presentations in the U.S., Canada, and Britain. Early American appearances include the U.S. Steel Hour, Encounter, and Playhouse 90. He also guest-starred on such TV series as Naked City, The Untouchables, The Twilight Zone, Wagon Train, The Defenders, The Invaders, The Starlost, and The Saint, episode: The Reluctant Revolution (season 5, episode 4). In The Outer Limits episode "Controlled Experiment", he starred with Carroll O'Connor and Grace Lee Whitney. In The Starlost episode "The Goddess Calabra", he guest-starred with John Colicos. In The Alfred Hitchcock Hour ‘A Tangled Web’ with Robert Redford & Zohra Lampert.

In his later years, Morse guest-starred in a number of Canadian-produced series, including La Femme Nikita and Kung Fu: The Legend Continues, as well as such British series as Doctors, Waking the Dead, and Space Island One.

Series
Morse's first television series was Presenting Barry Morse, which aired for 13 weeks in the summer of 1960 on the Canadian Broadcasting Corporation. Some of his best-known television roles included: Lt Philip Gerard on the 1960s series The Fugitive with David Janssen; Victor Bergman in the 1975–76 season of Space: 1999 with Martin Landau, Barbara Bain, and Zienia Merton; Mr Parminter in The Adventurer with Gene Barry; and Alec "the Tiger" Marlowe in The Zoo Gang with Sir John Mills, Lilli Palmer, and Brian Keith. In 1982, he played the Reaganesque U.S. President Johnny Cyclops in the satirical sitcom Whoops Apocalypse in the UK and hosted the series Strange But True for the Global and the BBC.

Miniseries
Morse appeared in a number of television miniseries, including The Winds of War and War and Remembrance (both with Robert Mitchum), The Martian Chronicles, Sadat, JFK: Reckless Youth, and Frederick Forsyth's Icon. Other notable miniseries appearances include A Woman of Substance, Master of the Game, and Race for the Bomb.

Books
The book based on his long-running stage play Merely Players – The Scripts was published in 2003. His first autobiography Pulling Faces, Making Noises was released in 2004.

Stories of the Theatre was published in 2006 and features material from his CBC radio series A Touch of Greasepaint, which aired from 1954 to 1967.

His theatrical memoir, Remember With Advantages – Chasing 'The Fugitive' and Other Stories from an Actor's Life, (written with Robert E. Wood and Anthony Wynn), details his life and career. The book features a foreword written by Academy Award-winning actor Martin Landau, and was released in 2007.

He wrote the afterword to Destination: Moonbase Alpha – The Unofficial and Unauthorised Guide to SPACE: 1999, published in 2010 by Telos Publishing, and written by Robert E. Wood. It featured a colour photo section of models created for the Space: 1999 television series by Martin Bower, and a foreword by Zienia Merton. Morse is extensively quoted throughout the book, as are numerous other series cast and crew.

Before his death, Morse wrote the foreword to Conversations at Warp Speed, published in 2012 by BearManor Media, and written by Anthony Wynn. The book is a compilation of interviews with actors and other professionals associated with the various incarnations of Star Trek.  It also contains a bonus chapter featuring an interview with Barry Morse, who worked with numerous actors who appeared in Star Trek.

Personal life

Family life
After a short courtship, Morse married actress Sydney Sturgess on 26 March 1939, during their work together in repertory theatre in Peterborough, Cambridgeshire. The couple had two children, Melanie Morse (1945–2005) and Hayward Morse (b. 1947).

In 1951, the Morse family moved to Canada, where he worked in radio and theatre, and participated in the first television broadcasts of CBC Television from Montreal, and later Toronto. Morse became a Canadian citizen in 1953.

Charitable work
Barry Morse long supported a number of charitable organisations, including the Toronto-based Performing Arts Lodges of Canada, the Royal Theatrical Fund, the London Shakespeare Workout Prison Project, Actors' Fund of Canada, the Samaritans, BookPALS, and Parkinson's disease treatment and research.

The cause of Parkinson's disease held a special place in Morse's heart, as his wife of more than 60 years, actress Sydney Sturgess, battled the illness for 14 years before her death in 1999. In later years, he also became an advocate for senior citizens in his adopted homeland of Canada.

Death
Barry Morse died on 2 February 2008 at University College Hospital, London, aged 89, after a brief illness. His body was donated to science, and on 3 April 2011 Morse's ashes were scattered in St. James's Square Garden, Pall Mall, London, England.

Selected filmography

The Goose Steps Out (1942) (with Will Hay) – Kurt
Thunder Rock (1942) – Robert
When We Are Married (1943) – Gerald Forbes
Schweik's New Adventures (1943) – S.A. prisoner
The Dummy Talks (1943) (uncredited)
Late at Night (1946) – Dave Jackson
This Man Is Mine (1946) – Ronnie
Mrs. Fitzherbert (1947) – Beau Brummell
Daughter of Darkness (1948) – Robert Stanforth
No Trace (1950) – John Harrison
The Twilight Zone (1962, episode: "A Piano in the House") – Fitzgerald Fortune
Kings of the Sun (1963) – Ah Zok
The Alfred Hitchcock Hour (1963, episode: "A Tangled Web") – Karl Gault
The Fugitive (1963-1967, TV series) – Lt. Philip Gerard
The Outer Limits (1964, TV Series) (with Carroll O'Connor) – Phobos One -('Controlled Experiment', episode)
The Invaders (1968, TV Series) – Keith
Justine (1969) – Colonel Maskelyne
Puzzle of a Downfall Child (1970) – Dr Galba
The Telephone Book (1971) – Har Poon
 The Golden Bowl (1972, TV series) – Adam Verver
Running Scared (1972) – Mr Case
Asylum (1972) – Bruno (segment "The Weird Tailor")
To Kill the King (1974) – Secretary
Space 1999 (1975-1976, TV series) – Victor Bergman
Love at First Sight (1977) – William
Welcome to Blood City (1977) – Supervisor
One Man (1977) – Colin Angus Campbell
Power Play (1978) – Jean Rousseau
The Shape of Things to Come (1979) – John Caball
The Martian Chronicles (1980, TV miniseries) – Peter Hathaway
Klondike Fever (1980) – John Thornton
The Changeling (1980) – Parapsychologist
Funeral Home (1980) – Mr Davis
The Hounds of Notre Dame (1980) – Bishop Williams
A Tale of Two Cities (1980, TV movie) – St. Evremonde
Murder by Phone (1982) – Fred Waites
Strange But True (1983) – Host
Reunion at Fairborough (1985, TV movie) – Nathan Barsky
The Railway Dragon (1988, TV movie) – The Railway Dragon
Glory! Glory! (1989, TV Movie) – Dan Stuckey
The Birthday Dragon (1992, TV Movie) - The Railway Dragon
Al lupo al lupo (1992) – Mario Sagonà
Sacred Trust (1997) – Mon Farare
Promise Her Anything (1999) – Reverend Adam Putter
I Really Hate My Job (2007) – Old Man #2 – Georg

References

External links

The Official Barry Morse Website
Destination: Moonbase Alpha – The Unofficial and Unauthorised Guide to Space: 1999
The Actors' Fund of Canada
Canadian Theatre Encyclopedia – Barry Morse
Obituary, The Globe and Mail
 
 
 
 

1918 births
2008 deaths
Alumni of RADA
Canadian male film actors
Canadian male soap opera actors
Canadian male stage actors
Canadian male television actors
English male film actors
English male soap opera actors
English male stage actors
People from Shoreditch
English male Shakespearean actors
Canadian people of English descent
Naturalized citizens of Canada
Canadian artistic directors
British emigrants to Canada
Canadian theatre directors